Kalkım is a town (belde) in the Yenice District, Çanakkale Province, Turkey. Its population is 2,400 (2021).

Geography 
Kalkım is situated to east of Kalkım pond and to the south of Agonya creek.

History 
The area around Kalkım was an important ironworking center during Lydian state and was named as Agonya. During the later years of the ancient age, It was annexed by Achaemenid Empire, Macedonian Empire, Pergamon and Roman Empire. In 1301, it was incorporated into Karesi state (a small Turkmen beylik) After the disintegration of Karesi it became a part of the Ottoman Empire . During Ottoman era it was called Naipli (Naipli is an adjective referring to vice judge working in the settlement). In the 20th century, following a brief Greek liberation it became a part of Turkey in 1922. In 1977 It was declared a seat of township.

Economy 

Most important agricultural products of the town are paprika and tobacco. Various fruits are also produced. Some town residents work in lead mines around the town and some work in forestry business. Carpet weaving is another business.

References 

Populated places in Çanakkale Province
Towns in Turkey
Yenice District, Çanakkale